Kossmaticeratidae is an extinct ammonoid family belonging to the order Ammonitida.

Subfamilies and genera
Kossmaticeratidae includes two subfamilies and eight genera:
 Kossmaticeratinae Spath, 1922
 Grossouvrites Kilian and Reboul, 1909
 Gunnarites Kilian and Reboul, 1909
 Kossmaticeras de Grossouvre, 1901
 Maorites Marshall, 1926
 Pseudokossmaticeras Spath, 1922
 Marshallitinae Matsumoto, 1955
 Eomarshallites Medina and Rinaldi, 1986
 Marshallites Matsumoto, 1955
 Yokoyamaoceras Wright and Matsumoto, 1954

Distribution
Fossils of members within this family have been found in the Cretaceous sediments of Antarctica, Argentina, Australia, Austria, Belgium, Canada, Chile, France, India, Japan, Madagascar, New Zealand, South Africa, United States as well as in the Jurassic of the United Kingdom.

References

 Arkell et al., 1957. Mesozoic Ammonoidea, L374; Treatise on Invertebrate Paleontology Part L (Ammonoidea); Geol Soc of America and Univ Kansas Press.

Ammonitida families
Oxfordian first appearances
Maastrichtian extinctions
Desmoceratoidea